Condom, also known as Condom-en-Armagnac, is a commune in southwestern France in the department of Gers, of which it is a subprefecture.

Geography

Localisation 
The town of Condom is located in the northern part of the department of Gers, halfway between Mont-de-Marsan (to the west) and Montauban (to the east), and north of Auch.

Roads and transports 
Way of St. James
Condom is a town on the Via Podiensis, one of the three major French arms of the pilgrimage route, the Way of St. James.

This particular route begins in Le Puy and ends in Santiago de Compostela in northwest Spain. Pilgrims arrive at Condom after Miradoux and continue on to Larressingle.

Toponymy 
There is no relationship between the English word condom and this town. The toponym Condom comes from the Gaulish words condate and magos combined into Condatomagos, which means "market or field, of the confluence".

Condatómagos evolved into Condatóm and then into Conddóm. It is where the river Gèle flows into the river Baïse.

Politics and administration

Mayors

Twin towns 
 Grünberg, Germany – since 1973
 Toro, Spain

Population

Sites of interest
Condom is the site of two castles, the Château de Mothes and the Château de Pouypardin, both started in the 13th century. In total, 19 sites in Condom are listed as monuments historiques by the French Ministry of Culture, including the cathedral, churches and houses.

Condom is known for the production of Armagnac, an international music festival of "bandas", an international chess tournament and an international chess marathon. It is also known for its tourism with farm campings and boating on waterways.  It is also home to a museum about Armagnac.

A statue of The Three Musketeers and d'Artagnan stands beside the cathedral and was created in 2010 by Zurab Tsereteli.

Notable people 
 Blaise de Montluc, marshal of France, buried in Condom.
 Scipion Dupleix (1569-1661).
 Jacques-Bénigne Bossuet (1627-1704).
 Jean-Charles Persil (1785-1870).
 Narcisse-Achille de Salvandy (1795-1856).
 Sarah Maldoror (1929-2020).
 Stéphane Abrial (1954-), French general born in Condom.
 Siouxsie Sioux (1957-), English singer and songwriter, moved to Condom in 1992 and left in 2015.
 Grégory Alldritt (1997-), French Rugby Union player
 Jean-Louis Palladin (May 7, 1946 – November 25, 2001), French/American Chef
 Larry L'Estrange (1934-2007), British soldier and rugby player, retired in Condom

See also
Bishop of Condom
Communes of the Gers department

References

External links

 

 Pictures of Condom 
 Le bonheur est dans le pré (Internet Movie Database)

Communes of Gers
Subprefectures in France
Gers communes articles needing translation from French Wikipedia